Damir Mehmedovic (born 11 December 1997) is an Austrian footballer who plays as a left-back.

Club career
He made his Austrian Football First League debut for FC Blau-Weiß Linz on 5 August 2016 in a game against SC Wiener Neustadt.

References

External links
 
 Damir Mehmedovic at OEFB

1997 births
Living people
Footballers from Linz
Austrian people of Bosnia and Herzegovina descent
Austrian footballers
Association football fullbacks
FC Juniors OÖ players
FC Blau-Weiß Linz players
SKN St. Pölten players
SV Lafnitz players
SC Wiener Neustadt players
1. FC Lokomotive Leipzig players
Austrian Regionalliga players
2. Liga (Austria) players
Austrian Football Bundesliga players
Slovenian PrvaLiga players
Regionalliga players
Austrian expatriate footballers
Austrian expatriate sportspeople in Slovenia
Expatriate footballers in Slovenia
Austrian expatriate sportspeople in Germany
Expatriate footballers in Germany